Yuei-An Liou is a Taiwanese professor at the National Central University.

Education
Liu received a Bachelor of Science from the National Sun Yat-Sen University (NSYSU) in 1987, and a Masters in Atmospheric and Space Sciences from the University of Michigan in 1994. He completed a PhD in Electrical Engineering and Atmospheric, Oceanic and Space Sciences at the University of Michigan in 1996.

Career
In 2001, Liou established the Graduate Institute of Hydrological Sciences in Taiwan. From 2005–2006, he was the Advisor and Division Director, Science Research Division, National Space Organization (NSPO), in charge of the satellite missions scientific research and development, and planning, including the Formosat-3 space mission. He was awarded the "Contribution Award to FORMOSAT3 National Space Mission" on July 20, 2006 and later in 2006 became the first Chair Professor at Chung-Yun University. He is the Distinguished Professor and Director at the Center for Space and Remote Sensing Research, National Central University. He has also established and chaired the Master of Science Program in Remote Sensing Science and Technology since 2008.

Liou specializes in Satellite Remote Sensing and Atmospheric Science. He has published numerous papers, including three journal special issues, and one book. He has developed and applied technology to a variety areas, including analyzing satellite images to provide assistance to international disasters including fires in Australia, a cyclone in Myanmar, the Sichuan earthquake in May 2008, and the flood disaster caused by Typhoon Morakot in August, 2009.

Liou has also served as an editor of the Journal of Aeronautics, Astronautics and Aviation since 2009 and the  IEEE Journal of Selected Topics in Applied Earth Observations and Remote Sensing (JSTARS) since 2008.

Liou was a member of The Republic of China National Committee for GBIF (Taipei, TAIWAN)) (GBIF, Global Biodiversity Information Facility) from 2011–2014, a member of the Working Group 7, Asia-Pacific Biodiversity Observation Network (AP BON, GEO) since 2020 and an advisor to the Public Construction Commission, Executive Yuan of Taiwan from 1994 to 2010. He has been the director of the Center for Space and Remote Sensing Research, National Central University, Taiwan since 2007, Co-Chairman of the Environmental Monitoring from Space of East Asia (EMSEA) (Japan, Korea, and Taiwan), since 2006, and was an advisor to the Atomic Energy Council, Executive Yuan of Taiwan from 200 to 2010.

Bibliography
 GPS Solutions, vol. 9, 2005: GPS Radio Occultation (RO) Experiments
 EEE Tran. on Geoscience and Remote Sensing, Vol. 46, 2008: Meteorology, Climate, Ionosphere, Geodesy, and Reflections from the Ocean surfaces: Studies by Radio Occultation Methods 
 GPS Solutions, vol. 14, 2010: GPS Radio Occultation (RO) Experiments II
 Radio occultation method for remote sensing of the atmosphere and ionosphere, February, 2010

Awards and honors
 2009: Corresponding Member, International Academy of Astronautics (IAA)
 2008: Outstanding Alumni Award, National Sun Yat-sen University
 2008: Outstanding Alumni Award, University of Michigan Alumni Association in Taiwan 
 2008: Foreign Member, Prokhorov Academy of Engineering Sciences, Russian Federation 
 2007: Honorary Life Member, The Korean Society of Remote Sensing (KSRS)

References

劉說安博士 
劉說安接任中大太遙中心 ，中央大學新聞組，2007-08-09，原文轉載自【2007-08-09/台灣新生報/16版】
獲頒中山大學傑出校友獎 ，國立中山大學中山新聞，2008-11-12
傑出校友－劉說安主任 ，國立中山大學校友電子報，2008-11-02
衛星影像做月曆 認識台灣變遷 ，人間福報，2007-12-04
側面看台灣什麼模樣？　像條鱷魚 ，中國評論新聞網，2007-12-03
中大太空遙測中心，推出衛星影像月曆 ，自由電子報，2008-11-05
中大教授劉說安獲選俄聯邦工程科學院院士 ，中央社，2008-04-01
劉說安獲選俄科學院士　籲政府挹注抗暖化 ，中央社，2008-04-05
獲俄頒院士 劉說安光榮返鄉 ，自由電子報，2008-04-28
外交部：俄國會成立友台小組 深化關係 ，中央社，2008-04-15
福衛二號照片顯示 傘兵救援危險性高 ，自由電子報，2008-05-15
汶川變形山路位移五十米河寬五倍 ，中國時報，2008-05-20　
福衛影像顯示 堰塞湖有潰決危險 ，中廣，2008-05-20
中大太遙中心　成立碩士班 ，中央大學新聞組，2008-05-29，原文轉載自【2008-05-29/聯合報/C2版】
福衛二號 觀測溫室效應 一目了然 ，人間福報，2009-01-23
福衛三號不遑多讓 可同步觀測全球氣象 ，人間福報，2009-01-23
極地解析》冰縫照得住 「福衛」最利天眼 ，聯合報，2008-12-10
北極冰原裂縫變化　福衛二號「照」得住 ，中央大學新聞網，原文轉載自 2006-03-31日自由時報A8
消失中的白色大地—全球暖化與極地保育國際研討會 
專題講座：從福爾摩沙二號觀測談全球暖化下消失中的白色大地!
我兩太空學家獲國際院士殊榮 為國爭光 ，中央大學新聞網，2009-10-26，原文轉載自【2009-10-16/中國廣播公司全球資訊網】
NSPO/NARL FORMOSAT2 Image Release for International Relief Efforts Sparkled in ISRS2006PORSEC ，2006.11.12，

External links
The Center for Space and Remote Sensing Research, National Central University
The Hydrology Remote Sensing Laboratory, National Central University 
The College of Electrical Engineering and Computer Science, Ching-Yun University 

Year of birth missing (living people)
Living people
Academic staff of the National Central University
National Sun Yat-sen University alumni
People from Yunlin County
Taiwanese scientists
University of Michigan College of Engineering alumni